Walden Martin (September 28, 1891 – November 17, 1966) was an American road racing cyclist who competed in the 1912 Summer Olympics. He was part of the team which won the bronze medal in the Team road race. In the individual road race, he finished 17th.

References

External links
Profile

1891 births
1966 deaths
American male cyclists
Cyclists at the 1912 Summer Olympics
Olympic bronze medalists for the United States in cycling
Medalists at the 1912 Summer Olympics